Adam Erik Marttinen (born 19 October 1983) is a Swedish politician of the Sweden Democrats party who is a member of the Riksdag.

Marttinen was born in Eskilstuna and is of Finnish descent. He was first elected to the Riksdag in 2014 and again in 2018 for the Södermanland County constituency. He is also a councilor for the Sweden Democrats in Eskilstuna and is the party group leader on the council. Marttinen sits on the Committee on Justice in parliament and has described counteracting segregation and reforming criminal policy as matters that he focuses on.

References 

1983 births
Living people
Swedish people of Finnish descent
Members of the Riksdag 2014–2018
Members of the Riksdag 2018–2022
Members of the Riksdag from the Sweden Democrats
Members of the Riksdag 2022–2026
21st-century Swedish politicians